Clinopodium troodi, the Troödos rock thyme, is a perennial spawling herb with a woody rootstock and reddish-green 5–20 cm long hairy shoots. Leaves opposite, simple, obscurely dentate, broadly ovate, 2-7 x 2–8 mm, petiolate, thinly hairy. Flowers in congested verticillasters, corolla bifid, pink or purple, much longer than calyx, flowers June–August, fruit of 4 nutlets.

Habitat 
Rocky slopes on serpentine at 1600–1950 m altitude.

Distribution
Endemic to Cyprus where it is confined to the highest peaks of the Troödos Mountains, mainly around Khionistra, where it is locally common.

References

External links
 http://www.ncu.org.cy/troodos/lang1/gallery/Acinos-troodi-web.jpg

troodi
Endemic flora of Cyprus